Dirk Kurtenbach (born 2 August 1964) is a German former footballer who played as a forward.

Kurtenbach started his career at 2. Bundesliga side Fortuna Köln in 1983 before signing for Stuttgarter Kickers three years later. He was part of the Stuttgarter Kickers side that reached the 1987 DFB-Pokal Final, scoring their only goal of a 3–1 defeat to Hamburger SV. He was the DFB-Pokal top scorer for the 1986–87 season, having scored 8 goals. He transferred to Waldhof Mannheim of the Bundesliga in summer 1988 before moving to Hertha BSC of the 2. Bundesliga later that year. He returned to Fortuna Köln in summer 1990, where he ended his career.

Career statistics

References

External links

Living people
1964 births
German footballers
Sportspeople from Bochum
Footballers from North Rhine-Westphalia
Association football forwards
SC Fortuna Köln players
Stuttgarter Kickers players
SV Waldhof Mannheim players
Hertha BSC players
Bundesliga players
2. Bundesliga players
West German footballers